Dumb Loud Hollow Twang Deluxe is The Bambi Molesters fourth studio album. It's the 2003 remake of their Dumb Loud Hollow Twang debut album (1997) in hi-fi sound quality with guest vocal appearance of Chris Eckman.

Track listing

Personnel
 Dalibor Pavičić - Guitar
 Dinko Tomljanović - Guitar
 Lada Furlan-Zaborac - Bass
 Hrvoje Zaborac - Drums

References

2003 albums
The Bambi Molesters albums